This is a list of seasons of the Newfoundland Senior Hockey League (NSHL), a senior ice hockey league, that operated from 1962 to 1989. The list also includes the seasons of the Newfoundland Amateur Hockey Association (NAHA), the predecessor organization of the NSHL.

NSHL Seasons 1962–1989

Canadian ice hockey-related lists
Newfoundland and Labrador sport-related lists